Santos Reyes Pápalo is a town and municipality in Oaxaca in south-western Mexico. The municipality covers an area of  km². 
It is part of Cuicatlán District in the north of the Cañada Region.

References

Municipalities of Oaxaca